Daniel Javier may refer to:

Daniel Falcon Javier, Filipino educator
Danny Javier, singer, musician, actor, distant relative of Daniel Falcon Javier